Gianni and the Ogre is a 1971 anthology of 18 fairy tales that have been collected and retold by Ruth Manning-Sanders. It is one in a long series of such anthologies by Manning-Sanders. This book was first published in the United Kingdom in 1970, by Methuen & Co. Ltd.

According to the dust jacket, all of the tales originated in the Mediterranean and the author's tales create "a lively fantasy world of kings and princesses, witches and dwarfs, fairies and fools."

Table of contents
1. Gianni and the Ogre
2. Kabadaluk
3. Mother Sunday
4. Bardiello
5. Celery
6. The Three Ravens
7. The Spider
8. The Doll
9. King Fox
The Lad and his Animals
The Witch and the Earthen Jar
The Battle
10. Oudelette
11. The Daughter of the Dwarf
12. The Bean Tree
13. Little Finger
14. A-tishoo!
15. Grillo
16. Trim Tram Turvey
17. The Fiddler Going Home
18. Peppino

See also

Ogre
Dwarf
Witchcraft

Collections of fairy tales
Children's short story collections
1970 short story collections
European fairy tales
1970 children's books
Methuen Publishing books
1970 anthologies